Maryam Palizban is an Iranian film and stage actress. She graduated in performing arts and theatre studies at Tehran University-Faculty of fine arts in 2004 and got her Ph.D. degree at the Free University Berlin, Germany in 2014.

She has been a research fellow on Performing martyrdom in ta'ziya as Shi'a Theatre-Ritual: "Martyrs on the Stage" within the project "Figurations of the Martyr in Near Eastern and European Literature” from 2012 to 2014 at the Center for literary and cultural research Berlin (ZfL).

Her KHK (Käte Hamburger Kollegs) project is entitled "The Theatrical Space of Beliefs, Transcendence and Immanence in Roman-Catholic and Shi'a-Islam: From Napoli to Rasht".

She played a leading part in Deep Breath, for which she was nominated as best actress by the Cinema Academy, 21st Fajr International Film Festival.  Other Iranian movies in which she appeared are Fat Shaker (2013) and Lantouri (2016).

Filmography
 Deep Breath (2003)
 Fat Shaker (2013)
 Lantouri (2016)

See also

Parviz Shahbazi

References

Sources
Degaran Website
www.lettersfromtentland.com
Palizban in Persian Wikipedia

External links

Maryam Plizban in Soureh Cinema website - (Persian)
Maryam palizban Personal Weblog - (Persian)

1981 births
Living people
People from Urmia
People from Tehran
People from Berlin
Iranian women bloggers
Iranian film actresses
Iranian stage actresses
21st-century Iranian poets
University of Tehran alumni
21st-century Iranian actresses
Free University of Berlin alumni